{{speciesbox
| name = Cream-breasted fruit dove
| image = Cream-bellied_Fruit_Dove_ssp_merilli.jpg
| image_caption = Cream-breasted Fruit Dove merilli seen in the wild in South Sierra Madre.
| image2 = Ptilinopus merrilli 1979 stamp of the Philippines.jpg
| image2_caption = A stamp of the 'merilli sub-species
| status = NT
| status_system = IUCN3.1
| status_ref = 
| genus = Ptilinopus
| species = merrilli
| authority = (McGregor, 1916)
| synonyms = Cream-bellied Fruit Dove
}}

The cream-breasted fruit dove (Ptilinopus merrilli) or cream-bellied fruit dove is a species of bird in the family Columbidae. It is endemic to the Luzon region of the Philippines.Its natural habitat is subtropical or tropical moist lowland to montane forests of up to 1,300 masl. It is threatened by habitat loss, and trapping for the pet trade.

It is illegal to hunt, capture or keep cream-breasted fruit-doves under Philippine Law RA 9147.

 Taxonomy and systematics 
The cream-breasted fruit dove is one of over 50 species in the genus Ptilinopus. Within the genus, it is most closely allied with the flame-breasted fruit dove.

It was formerly placed in the obsolete genus Leucotreron. The species' generic name comes from the Greek ptilon (feather) and pous (foot), while the specific epithet is in honor of Elmer Drew Merrill, an American botanist. Alternative names for the cream-breasted fruit dove include Merrill's fruit dove.

 Subspecies 

 P. m. merrilli – MacGregor, 1916: The nominate subspecies, found in southern  Luzon from the southern part of the Sierra Madres down to Bicol and Catanduanes region

 P. m. faustinoi'' – Manuel, 1936: Found in the mountains of northern Luzon starting from Quirino. Has a red crown patch.

Habitat and Conservation Status 
This frugivorous species is found chiefly in primary and selectively logged forest up to 1,300 m in the Sierra Madre.

This bird is listed as near-threatened with its primary threats being habitat loss and hunting for both food and the pet trade.

References

Cited text 

 

cream-breasted fruit dove
Birds of Luzon
Fauna of Catanduanes
Endemic birds of the Philippines
cream-breasted fruit dove
Taxonomy articles created by Polbot
Taxobox binomials not recognized by IUCN